Locke & Key is an American comic book series written by Joe Hill and illustrated by Gabriel Rodríguez.

Lock & Key may also refer to:

 Locke & Key (TV pilot)
 Locke & Key (TV series)

See also
 Lock and Key (disambiguation)